WSSS-LP, UHF analog channel 25, was a low-powered television station licensed to Steubenville, Ohio, United States. The station was owned by Benjamin Perez. At one time, it was an affiliate of MTV2.

History
The station began transmitting as a low-power television station in May 1998 on channel 25 as The Box, an automated music video channel. Like most over-the-air stations airing The Box, WSSS-LP became an affiliate of MTV2 after The Box was acquired by Viacom in 2001.

Because CBS owned-and-operated station KDKA-TV (channel 2) began broadcasting digitally on channel 25, WSSS-LP was temporarily forced off the air. The station returned to the air in July 2001 as a Class-A station on channel 29.

In 2014, the station went silent because of financial trouble.

The station's license was cancelled by the Federal Communications Commission effective July 14, 2021, for failing to file for a license to transition to digital operation.

See also
 WBYD-CD
 WIIC-LD

References

External links
 MTV2 Official site
 

Steubenville, Ohio
Television stations in Ohio
Television channels and stations established in 1999
1999 establishments in Ohio
Defunct television stations in the United States
Television channels and stations disestablished in 2021
2021 disestablishments in Ohio
SSS-LP